Cansel Kiziltepe (born 8 October 1975) is a German economist and politician of the Social Democratic Party (SPD) who has been serving as a member of the Bundestag from the state of Berlin since the 2013 elections.

In addition to her parliamentary work, Kiziltepe has been serving as Parliamentary State Secretary in the Federal Ministry for Housing, Urban Development and Building in the coalition government of Chancellor Olaf Scholz since 2021.

Early life and career 
Of ethnic Turkish origin, Kiziltepe studied economics at the Technical University of Berlin. From 2005 until 2012, she worked as legislative advisor to Ottmar Schreiner. She subsequently worked as economist on the staff of board member Horst Neumann at Volkswagen from 2012 until 2013.

Political career 
Kiziltepe became a member of the Bundestag in the 2013 German federal election. She has since been a member of the Finance Committee; in this capacity, she is her parliamentary group's rapporteur on plans to introduce a financial transaction tax. In 2018, she also joined the Sports Committee.

Within the SPD parliamentary group, Kiziltepe belongs to the Parliamentary Left, a left-wing movement.

In the negotiations to form a so-called traffic light coalition of the SPD, the Green Party and the Free Democratic Party (FDP) following the 2021 federal elections, Kiziltepe was part of her party's delegation in the working group on financial regulation and the national budget, co-chaired by Doris Ahnen, Lisa Paus and Christian Dürr.

Other activities 
 German Federal Environmental Foundation (DBU), Member of the Board of Trustees (since 2022)
 Business Forum of the Social Democratic Party of Germany, Member of the Advisory Board on Economic Policy (since 2020)
 Nuclear Waste Disposal Fund (KENFO), Member of the Board of Trustees (2018–2022)
 IG Metall, Member

References

External links 

  
 Bundestag biography 

1975 births
Living people
Members of the Bundestag for Berlin
Female members of the Bundestag
21st-century German women politicians
Members of the Bundestag 2021–2025
Members of the Bundestag 2017–2021
Members of the Bundestag 2013–2017
Politicians from Berlin
German politicians of Turkish descent
Members of the Bundestag for the Social Democratic Party of Germany
Technical University of Berlin alumni